La Vie moderne: intégrale 1944-1959 (Modern life: complete collection 1944-1959) is a 14-CD box set compilation of Léo Ferré studio and live albums recorded for Le Chant du Monde and Odeon Records between 1950 and 1958. The box set brings together for the first time nine historical albums, several 78s and 45s cuts, rarities and unreleased radio archives, with many alternative versions. Lyrics are not included.
This is the first box set of a complete collection of works recorded by the artist.

Track listing 
CD 1: Le Temps des roses rouges (Le Chant du Monde, 1950)
Brings 78s cuts together.
 La Chanson du scaphandrier
 Monsieur William
 Monsieur Tout-Blanc 
 La Vie d'artiste 
 Le Bateau Espagnol 
 La Femme adultère 
 À Saint-Germain-des-Prés 
 L'Île Saint-Louis 
 Le Flamenco de Paris 
 L'Inconnue de Londres 
 Les Forains 
 Barbarie 
 L'a toute de la Moretta 
 Le Temps des roses rouges 
 L'Île Saint-Louis (alternative version)
 Le Flamenco de Paris (alternative version)

CD 2: Chansons de Léo Ferré (Le Chant du Monde, 1954)
New recording of the previously released 78s songs.
 L'Île Saint-Louis 
 La Chanson du scaphandrier 
 Barbarie 
 L'Inconnue de Londres 
 Le Bateau Espagnol 
 À Saint-Germain-des-Prés 
 La Vie d'artiste 
 Le Flamenco de Paris 
 Les Forains 
 Monsieur Tout-Blanc 
 L'Esprit de famille

CD 3: Paris canaille (Odeon, 1953)
 Monsieur William
 La Chambre
 Vitrines
 Le Pont Mirabeau
 Judas
 Notre amour
 ... Et des clous
 Les Cloches de Notre-Dame
 Paris canaille
 Martha la mule
 Les Grandes Vacances

CD 4: Le Piano du pauvre (Odeon, 1954)
 Le Piano du pauvre
 À la Seine
 L'Homme
 Le Parvenu
 Mon p'tit voyou
 Notre-Dame de la mouise
 Graine d'ananar
 Merci mon Dieu
 Mon p'tit voyou (instrumental)
 Merci mon Dieu (instrumental)

CD 5: La Rue (Odeon, 1955)
This disc sets 78s and 45s cuts together posthumously.
 La Rue
 Vise la réclame
 Ma vieille branche
 Monsieur mon passé
 L'âme du rouquin
 La Vie
 La Chanson triste
 En amour
 Le Fleuve aux amants

CD 6: Récital à l'Olympia (Odeon, 1955)
Live show recorded at Olympia music hall (Paris) between the 10th and the 13th of March 1955. Orchestra conducting: Gaston Lapeyronnie. 
 La Vie 
 Monsieur mon passé 
 Graine d'ananar 
 Le Piano du pauvre
 Vise la réclame 
 L'Homme
 Merci mon Dieu 
 Mon p'tit voyou 
 Monsieur William
 L'Âme du rouquin 
 Paris canaille
 La Rue

CD 7: Le Guinche (Odeon, 1955)
 Le Guinche
 La Fortune
 Ma vieille branche
 T'en as
 La Grande Vie
 Le Temps du plastique
 Pauvre Rutebeuf
 L'Amour
 L’été s’en fout
 Les Copains d'la neuille

CD 8: Les Fleurs du mal (Odeon, 1957)
Léo Ferré sings Charles Baudelaire. 
 Harmonie du soir
 Le serpent qui danse
 Les Hiboux
 Le Léthé
 Le Revenant
 La Mort des amants
 L'Invitation au voyage
 Les Métamorphoses du vampire
 A celle qui est trop gaie
 La Vie antérieure
 La Pipe
 Brumes et pluies
 L'Invitation au voyage (radio version)

CD 9: La Chanson du mal-aimé (Odeon, 1957)
Léo Ferré sings Guillaume Apollinaire. 
 La Chanson du mal-aimé
 La Symphonie interrompue (concert live from 1954)

CD 10: Léo Ferré à Bobino (Odeon, 1958)
Live show recorded at Bobino music hall between the 3rd and the 15th of January 1958. 
Musicians: Jean Cardon (accordion), Barthélémy Rosso (guitar), Paul Castanier (piano), Léo Ferré (piano). 
 La Fortune 
 Comme dans la haute
 Java partout 
 Monsieur mon passé 
 Le Guinche 
 Le Flamenco de Paris 
 Pauvre Rutebeuf
 Les Indifférentes
 La Zizique 
 Mon Sébasto
 L'Homme
 T'en as 
 Graine d'ananar 
 Paris canaille

CD 11: Encore... du Léo Ferré (Odeon, 1958)
 Le Temps du tango
 La Chanson triste 
 La Vie moderne
 Mon camarade
 L’été s’en fout 
 Le Jazz band
 L’Étang chimérique
 Dieu est nègre
 Les Copains d’la neuille 
 Tahiti
 Java partout
 La Zizique
 Mon Sébasto

CD 12: Documents 1 - 1944-1952
French Radio broadcasting and artist's personal archives. 
 Le Carnaval de tous les jours (1944)
 L'Opéra du ciel (1945)
 Suzon (1945)
 Le Viveur lunaire (1946)
 Ils broyaient du noir (1946)
 Moi, j' vois tout en bleu (1946)
 Moi, j' vois tout en bleu (instrumental, 1946)
 Paris (1948)
 Les Grandes Vacances (1948)
 La Rengaine d'amour (1948)
 Les Châteaux (1949)
 La Clef (1949)
 Le Fleuve aux amants (1949)
 J'ai tant rêvé (1950)
 La Chambre (1950)
 À La Villette (1950)
 Les Cloches de Notre-Dame (live, 1950)
 Madame Angleterre (live, 1950)
 Viole de voiles (1950)
 L'Île Saint-Louis (1950)
 Les Hommes de la nuit (movie soundtrack, 1952)

CD 13: Documents 2 - De sacs et de cordes
Radio drama for narrator, singers and orchestra. Narrator: Jean Gabin 
 Ouverture 
 Frères humains
  L'Esprit de famille 
  « Ah ! La rue... » 
  Air du cireur 
  La Bonne Aventure 
  « Brusquement cette charmante enfant... »  
  Les Forains 
  La Tamise 
  Madame Angleterre  
  « Je suis parti sur un de ces bateaux... »  
  Ohé oh hisse 
  Madre De Dios 
  « Dans les flancs du Madre de Dios... »  
  Le Flamenco de Paris 
  Le Bateau espagnol 
  C'est la fille du pirate 
  « Les deniers me crevaient les poches... »  
  En amour (ouverture) 
  En amour 
  La Femme adultère 
  Dans les draps que l'amour 
  Barbarie 
  Les Douze 
  « Ils me redonnèrent quelque goût... » 
  Les Oiseaux libres 
  « Pour soulever le toit... » 
  Kol Nidrei 
  Petit soldat 
  « Au paradis des pauvres chiens... » 
  « Je décidais de me fixer... » 
  L'Inconnue de Londres 
  « Si j'avais eu le sens du repentir... »  
  Le Parvenu 
  Frères humains (reprise)

CD 14: Documents 3 - 1953-1959
French Radio broadcasting archives. 
 Byzance (1953)
 Le Piano du pauvre (1954)
 Le Pont Mirabeau (1955)
 Pauvre Rutebeuf (1956)
 L'Opéra du ciel (1957)
 Dieu est nègre (1955 ou 57 ?)
 La Zizique (1957)
 Les Amoureux du Havre (1958)
 Comme dans la haute (1958)
 La Mafia (1958)
 Rappelle-toi (1957)
 Tu n'en reviendras pas (1959)
 Je chante pour passer le temps (1959)
 L'Étrangère (1959)
 La Belle Amour (1959)
 Soleil (1959)
 Des filles, il en pleut... (1959)
 Green (1959)
 L'Âge d'or (1959)
 Sérénade (1959)
 La Mauvaise Graine (1959)
 Noël (1959)

Credits 
 Production: Mathieu Ferré & Alain Raemackers
 Visual artists: Hervé Morvan (boxset picture), Joseph Cayet, Harcourt, D.R., Hubert Grooteclaes (booklet photos), Vital Maladrech (graphic design), Max Brunel, Serge Jacques, Georges Justh, André Bonnet, Joseph Cayet, Gabriel Terbots, Hervé Morvan, André Villers (original albums covers) 
 Liner notes: Mathieu Ferré, Alain Raemackers

References

External links 
 Box Set presentation (French)

Léo Ferré albums
1950s albums
2018 compilation albums
French-language compilation albums
Universal Music Group compilation albums